Namets! is a 2008 Filipino independent film directed by Jay Abello. The film was a finalist in the full-length feature category of the 2008 Cinemalaya Philippine Independent Film Festival. The film's title is a play on the Hiligaynon word namit, which means "yummy" or "delicious".

Plot
Jacko Teves (Christian Vasquez) owns Puccini's, an Italian restaurant in Bacolod. When a monstrous cock fighting debt sets him at odds with Boss Dolpo (Peque Gallaga), he offers his restaurant up as payment. Boss Dolpo brings in Cassie Labayen (Angel Jacob) as a consultant to renovate the restaurant. Much to Jacko's dismay, Cassie decides to offer Negrense cuisine instead of Italian. The pair then set off across the province re-discovering the unique aspects of Negrense food.

Cast
Jacko Teves: Christian Vasquez
Cassie Labayen: Angel Jacob
Boss Dolpo: Peque Gallaga
Oscar: Dwight Gaston
Rodrigo Labayen: Louie Zabaljauregui
Imelda Teves: Michelle Gallaga
Nena Teves: Marivic Lacson
Babyboy Labayen: Monsour del Rosario
Farmer: Ronnie Lazaro
Caveman: Joel Torre

Production
The film was shot on location entirely in the province of Negros Occidental. Locales included Isabela, Sagay City, Silay City and Bacolod. Seventy percent of the cast and crew were locally sourced talent and the dialogue is in Hiligaynon with English subtitles.

References

External links

2008 films
Philippine romance films
Films directed by Jay Abello